The Fountain Hills Times is a weekly newspaper covering Maricopa County, Arizona, USA, published in Fountain Hills, Arizona.

The newspaper was first published on June 27, 1974, and provides news coverage for the communities of Fountain Hills, The Verdes and Fort McDowell. 

Western States Publishers, Inc., the parent company, publishes several publications, including the Fountain Hills/Rio Verde Telephone Directory, Fountain Hills Community Guide, Fountain Hills HOME, Let's Go! and Back-to-School and Graduation editions.

References

External links
 National Newspaper Association 2012 Better Newspaper Contest Winners
 Arizona Newspapers Association: Fountain Hills Times Publisher Alan Cruikshank Honored 

Newspapers published in Arizona
Fountain Hills, Arizona